The Congo gerbil or Congo tateril (Taterillus congicus) is a species of rodent found in Cameroon, Central African Republic, Chad, Democratic Republic of the Congo, Sudan, and possibly Uganda. Its natural habitat is dry savanna.

References

Musser, G. G. and M. D. Carleton. 2005. Superfamily Muroidea. pp. 894–1531 in Mammal Species of the World a Taxonomic and Geographic Reference. D. E. Wilson and D. M. Reeder eds. Johns Hopkins University Press, Baltimore.

Taterillus
Mammals described in 1915
Taxa named by Oldfield Thomas
Rodents of Africa
Taxonomy articles created by Polbot